Megacyllene insignita is a species of beetle in the family Cerambycidae. It was described by Perroud in 1855.

References

Megacyllene
Beetles described in 1855